Bembecia puella is a moth of the family Sesiidae. It is found in Slovakia, Hungary, Romania, Bulgaria, Greece, Ukraine and Russia. It has also been recorded from Kazakhstan.

The wingspan is 22–23 mm.

The larvae feed on Astragalus glycyphyllos, Astragalus odoratus and Astragalus sigmoideus.

References

Moths described in 1989
Sesiidae
Moths of Europe
Moths of Asia